George Byron Smith (March 7, 1839 – December 13, 1917) was an Ontario merchant and political figure. He represented York East in the Legislative Assembly of Ontario as a Liberal member from 1886 to 1894.

He was born in Newtonville, Upper Canada in 1839, the son of N.C. Smith, and was employed as a clerk in his father's business at the age of thirteen. In 1861, he opened his own store at St. Mary's. In the same year, he married Maria Allan. Smith served on the town council there. In 1875, he opened a wholesale dry goods outlet in Toronto, in partnership with a former employee, Duncan Henderson, and moved to Toronto. The store in St. Mary's was managed by another former employee, now a partner, Jeremiah White. Smith also served as an alderman for the city of Toronto. He died on a trip to Los Angeles in 1917.

External links 

 The Canadian parliamentary companion, 1891 JA Gemmill
 
 

1839 births
1917 deaths
Businesspeople from Ontario
Ontario Liberal Party MPPs
Toronto city councillors
People from Clarington